Studley & Astwood Bank railway station was a station in Studley, Warwickshire, England. The station was opened on 4 May 1868, passenger train service withdrawn in 1962 officially closed to passengers on 17 June 1963 and closed completely on 6 July 1964.

References

Further reading

Disused railway stations in Warwickshire
Railway stations in Great Britain opened in 1868
Railway stations in Great Britain closed in 1963
Former Midland Railway stations